Oleh Vitaliyovych Len (born 7 April 2002) is a Ukrainian professional footballer who plays as a left-back for Ukrainian club Karpaty Lviv.

References

External links
 Profile on Prykarpattia Ivano-Frankivsk official website
 
 

2002 births
Living people
People from Rava-Ruska
Ukrainian footballers
Association football defenders
FC Prykarpattia Ivano-Frankivsk (1998) players
FC Rukh Lviv players
FC Karpaty Lviv players
Ukrainian First League players
Sportspeople from Lviv Oblast